Johny Bonny is a 2022 Indian Bengali language thriller web series written and directed by Abhijit Chowdhury. The series is produced by Deb Sarkar.

The main cast of the series is Kamaleshwar Mukherjee, Debashish Mondal, Ankit Majumder, Swastika Dutta, Jayati Chakraborty and Pushpita Mukherjee.

Plot
The story is on the chess game, the policing system, and the dream of a young cop and a boy. It is Johny and Bonny's first investigation-related story.

Johny, a young police officer who wants to become a well-known investigator, ends himself working as a security cover for Promod Sen, a prominent politician whose wife Suroma makes out to adore Johny as if he were her own son. In addition, despite Pramod's protests, Johny is permitted to work mostly as a housekeeper, buying food for the household or regularly walking their daughter's dog. Johny must keep lying to his wife Ankhi about his duties in order to protect his pride.

Bonny, Ankhi's nephew, who is 13 years old, quits his Durgapur home and travels to Janardan's home to play chess in Kolkata. Johny and Bonny have a difficult relationship, similar to Tom and Jerry. Johny is a traditionalist who believes children should respect adults. Bonny asserts that in the modern environment, kids can be smarter and more logical than adults. Johny tries to tell Ankhi one of his made-up tales from while he was on duty, but every time Bonny calls them flat lies, Johny is unsuccessful.

However, when three armed criminals try to enter Promod's house, things swiftly get out of hand. Johny puts up a fight against the invaders despite being shot, which takes extraordinary bravery. Johny discovers over the course of his inquiry that Promod Sen's daughter has been missing ever since the tragedy. The attack was carried out by some very powerful individuals, Johny realises during the investigation, and his department is hesitant to solve the case. At the same time, the Bonny chess tournament gets underway. Bonny wants to help Johny, but Johny doesn't want it.

Cast
Kamaleshwar Mukherjee
Debasish Mondal
Ankit Majumder
Swastika Dutta
Jayati Chakraborty
Pushpita Mukherjee
Judhajit Sarkar
Loknath Dey

Episodes

Reception
Netseries gave it 4.6 out of 5 reviews. Binged gave it 8.7 out of 10 ratings.

Soundtrack
1. Johny Bonny (Original Score from the series)

References

External links 
 

Bengali-language web series
2022 web series debuts
Indian thriller films